Ida Glanzmann (born 29 September 1958), is a Swiss politician and current Vice President of the Christian Democratic People's Party.

From 1995 to 2006 she was active as councillor in the legislature of the canton of Lucerne. Between 1997 and 2004 she was Vice-President of CVP Canton Lucerne. 2001 to 2009 she chaired the CVP Women Switzerland.

Glanzmann-Hunkeler was elected to the National Council on 18 September 2006. As part of its mandate Parliament she is a member of the Control Committee and the Safety Policy Committee and delegates to the Parliamentary Assembly of the OSCE.

Glanzmann-Hunkeler lives in Altishofen. She has three children. She is a great-great granddaughter of Josef Zemp.

External links
 Ida Glanzmann official website
 Ida Glanzmann profile

Living people
1958 births
Christian Democratic People's Party of Switzerland politicians